Stegall is an unincorporated community in Jackson County, Arkansas, United States.

Geography
Stegall is located at  (35.607302, -91.140125).

History

in 1942 [2] the  Stegall community  school was annexed into Newport Arkansas 72112.

References

2. records on file, jackson county courthouse, newport Arkansas

External links

1922 School Census, Stegall Community, Jackson County, Arkansas
 http://files.usgwarchives.net/ar/jackson/census/school/steg1922.txt

1929 School Census, Stegall Community, Jackson County, Arkansas
 http://files.usgwarchives.net/ar/jackson/census/school/steg1929.txt

1930 School Census, Stegall Community, Jackson County, Arkansas
 http://files.usgwarchives.net/ar/jackson/census/school/steg1930.txt

1931 School Census, Stegall Community, Jackson County, Arkansas
 http://files.usgwarchives.net/ar/jackson/census/school/steg1931.txt

1932 School Census, Stegall Community, Jackson County, Arkansas
 http://files.usgwarchives.net/ar/jackson/census/school/steg1932.txt

1940 School Census, Stegall Community, Jackson County, Arkansas
 http://files.usgwarchives.net/ar/jackson/census/school/steg1940.txt

Unincorporated communities in Jackson County, Arkansas
Unincorporated communities in Arkansas
Populated places established in 1905
1905 establishments in Arkansas